Julio Manuel Naya Barba (born July 17, 1968) is a Mexican football manager.

At the beginning of his career he served as assistant of Indios de Ciudad Juárez, Tigres B, León, UAT and Deportivo Guamúchil. In 2012 he was appointed as UAT Premier manager, position in which he remained until 2013. In 2017, Naya was the temporary head coach of Real Estelí FC, after that, in 2018 he was hired by Coras de Nayarit F.C.

References

1968 births
Living people
Mexican football managers